Geling Yan (born 16 November 1958) is a Chinese-American author and screenwriter.

Early life

Yan was born in Shanghai, China in 1958. She is the second child of Yan Dunxun and Jia Lin. She has an elder brother Yan Geping (严歌平). Her father is an alumnus of the College of Architecture and Urban Planning of Tongji University.

Yan began performing as a dancer at age 12.  She served in the People's Liberation Army in Chengdu, during the Cultural Revolution in Tibet and later as a journalist in the Sino-Vietnamese War, achieving a rank equivalent to lieutenant colonel.

Yan holds a bachelor's degree in literature from Wuhan University, and a Master's in Fine Arts in Fiction Writing from Columbia College Chicago.

Career

Works
Her first novel was published in 1985. She is the author of such novels as The Banquet Bug (published as The Uninvited in the UK) and The Lost Daughter of Happiness, as well as a story collection entitled White Snake and Other Stories. Several of Yan's works have been adapted for film, including Xiu Xiu: The Sent-Down Girl, which was directed by Joan Chen, and Siao Yu, directed by Sylvia Chang and screenplay co-written by Ang Lee. Zhang Yimou, the Chinese director of To Live and Raise the Red Lantern  adapted her novella 13 Flowers of Nanjing to the screen as The Flowers of War, and his movie Coming Home was based on Yan's novel The Criminal Lu Yanshi. She has worked on other scripts including a biography of Mei Lanfang, the Peking opera star, for Chinese director Chen Kaige.

Novels in English
 The Banquet Bug  (written in English, published as The Uninvited in the UK)
 The Lost Daughter of Happiness  (tr. Cathy Silber, Chinese title Fusang 《扶桑》)
 The Flowers of War  (tr. Nicky Harman, Chinese title Jinling shisan chai 《金陵十三钗》)
 Little Aunt Crane  (tr. Esther Tyldesley, Chinese title Xiaoyi Duohe 《小姨多鶴》)
The Criminal Lu Yanshi (adapted into a movie, titled Coming Home)《陆犯焉识》
 The Secret Talker

Novels in Chinese
 芳华（Youth）

Short stories in English
 The Landlady (tr. Lawrence A. Walker)
 Disappointing Returns (tr. David Haysom)
 White Snake and Other Stories (tr. Lawrence A. Walker)

Title
She is a member of the Hollywood Writers Guild of America, the Writer's Association of China, and the Academy of Motion Picture Arts and Sciences.

Censorship in China

As of 11 February 2022, Yan was censored on China's internet after commenting on the atrocity and government cover-ups in the Xuzhou chained woman incident and agreeing with Zhou Xiaozheng's assessment that Chinese Communist Party leader Xi Jinping is a "human trafficker" who imposed a large sum of money for "donation" on foreign families who adopt Chinese orphans. Baidu Baike showed "Sorry, the page you're visiting no longer exists" for Yan's entry. The search results for Yan's name on Sina Weibo became unavailable.

Personal life
Yan's ex-husband is Li Kewei; they divorced in the 1990s. In 1992, Yan married her second husband Lawrence Walker in San Bruno, California. Walker is a diplomat. They have no biological children together, but have adopted a Chinese girl, Yanyan.

References

External links

 Geling Yan's website
 Geling Yan at Peony Literary Agency
 Geling Yan profile at Paper Republic
 
 Book Browse Biography
 
 https://web.archive.org/web/20080121031733/http://www.redroom.com/author/geling-yan
 Yan Geling   Video produced by Makers: Women Who Make America
 Geling Yan on BBC Radio 4 Woman's Hour, 19 November 2015 (07:18 to 15:55)

Chinese women short story writers
Chinese short story writers
Chinese dramatists and playwrights
1958 births
Living people
Chinese women novelists
Chinese novelists
Short story writers from Shanghai
American writers of Chinese descent
People's Liberation Army officers
Chinese journalists
Sino-Vietnamese War
People's Republic of China short story writers
Wuhan University alumni
Columbia College Chicago alumni